The 2015 Travelers Northern Ontario Men's Provincial Championship, the "provincial" men's curling championship of Northern Ontario was held February 4–8 at the Kenora Recreation Centre in Kenora, Ontario. The winning Brad Jacobs team represented Northern Ontario at the 2015 Tim Hortons Brier in Calgary.

Teams

Round robin standings

Scores

February 4
Draw 1
Jacobs 6-1 Glibota
Hackner 6-4 Currie
Johnston 7-2 Burgess
Jakubo 6-5 Mikkelsen

Draw 2
Johnston 4-3 Jakubo
Burgess 9-5 Mikkelsen
Hackner 7-4 Glibota
Jacobs 7-4 Currie

February 5
Draw 3
Hackner 7-6 Burgess
Jacobs 4-3 Jakubo
Currie 6-3 Mikkelsen
Johnston 8-3 Glibota

Draw 4
Johnston 7-5 Currie
Mikkelsen 7-1 Glibota
Jacobs 9-4 Burgess
Hackner 6-3 Jakubo

February 6
Draw 5
Jacobs 9-3 Mikkelsen
Johnston 9-8 Hackner
Jakubo 7-3 Currie
Glibota 6-5 Burgess

Draw 6
Currie 6-5 Glibota
Jakubo 5-2 Burgess
Jacobs 6-4 Hackner
Johnston 6-4 Mikkelsen

February 7
Draw 7
Hackner 9-3 Mikkelsen
Jacobs 6-3 Johnston
Jakubo 7-1 Glibota
Burgess 6-2 Currie

Playoffs

Final

References

2015 Tim Hortons Brier
Curling in Northern Ontario
Sport in Kenora
2015 in Ontario
February 2015 sports events in Canada